Unia Tarnów is a Polish motorcycle speedway club from Tarnów in Poland. The team compete in the Polish Speedway Second League (2. Liga). and have won the Team Speedway Polish Championship three times.

History

1957 to 1989 
The club was founded 1957 as a section of a multi-sports club of the same name, which was founded in 1928. It would not be until 2001 that the club became a separate entity but retained the same historic name.

The first honour was winning the second division in 1963. Zygmunt Pytko later became the Polish champion in 1967.

The team spent most of the 1970s and 1980s either battling relegation in the first division or challenging promotion in the second division but in general there was little in the way of success.

1990 to 1999
The club gained promotion in 1990 and made a statement of intent in 1994 by signing one of the world's leading riders Tony Rickardsson. The impact was instant and they won a silver medal in the Polish Championship. However, not even Rickardsson could save them from relegation in 1996.

2000 to 2015 

When the Ekstraliga was introduced in 2000, the team were competing in the 2. Liga but in 2001 the sealed promotion and began to build in form. 

Janusz Kołodziej and Tomasz Gollob were signed and Rickardsson returned for the 2004 Polish speedway season. The team won the gold medal for the first time in their history and then successfully defended their title in 2005. Three  Unia riders became consecutive Polish champions, Kołodziej was champion in 2005, Gollob in 2006 and Rune Holta in 2007. Gollob and Holta also won the 2007 pairs championship.

Further success came from 2012 to 2016 as the club won the gold medal in 2012, the pairs in 2013 and three consecutive bronze medals in 2013, 2014 and 2015. Maciej Janowski also won the 2013 Golden Helmet.

2016 to present
Since 2015, the team have experienced mediocrity with just one 1.Liga title success in 2017.

Teams

2023 team

  Tero Aarnio 
  René Bach
  Oskar Bober
  William Drejer
  Mateusz Gzyl
  Kenneth Hansen
  Jan Heleniak
  Matic Ivačič
  Daniel Klima
  Ernest Koza
  Richard Lawson
  Patryk Rolnicki
  Piotr Pioro
  Pawel Pikul
  Piotr Swiercz

Previous teams

2022 team

  Kenneth Hansen 
  Peter Ljung
  William Drejer 
  Oskar Bober
  Patryk Rolnicki
  Tero Aarnio 
  Piotr Swiercz

Notable riders

Honours
Team Polish Champions
Gold: 3 (2004, 2005, 2012)
Silver: 1 (1994)
Bronze: 2 (2013, 2014)

Pair Polish Champion
Gold: 2 (2007, 2013)
Silver: 2 (2004, 2009)

Individual Polish Champion
Gold: 5 (1967, 2005, 2006, 2007, 2013)
Silver: 3 (2005, 2007, 2010)
Bronze: 3 (2005, 2009, 2013)

References

Polish speedway teams
Sport in Tarnów